Jansky is a non-SI unit of electromagnetic flux.

Jansky or Janský may also refer to:
 1932 Jansky, a main belt asteroid
 Jansky (crater), a lunar crater
 Jansky (band), electroverse duet

People
 Jansky (surname)

See also 
 Jansky noise, high frequency static disturbances of cosmic origin
 Jansky–Bielschowsky disease
 Jánský vrch
 Janská, a village and municipality in Děčín District, Ústí nad Labem Region, Czech Republic